Poté is a municipality of Minas Gerais, Brazil.

Pote or Poté may also refer to:

Pedro Gonçalves (born 1998), full name Pedro António Pereira Gonçalves and known as Pote, Portuguese football midfielder

Surname
People with the surname Pote or Poté include:

Lou Pote (born 1971), American baseball pitcher
Michael Pote (born 1989), South African cricketer
Mickaël Poté (born 1984), Beninese football forward
Pravin Pote, Indian politician from Maharashtra
Romain Poté (1935–2010), Belgian sprinter
William Pote (1718 – c. 1755), British surveyor and ship captain

Given name
People with the given name Pote include:

Pote Sarasin (1905–2000), Thai diplomat and politician
Pote Human (born 1959), real name Gerhard Human, South African rugby union player and coach

See also
Capt. Greenfield Pote House, historic house located in Freeport, Maine, United States
Phot (given name)